Charles Andreae (16 December 1906 – 22 June 1970) was an English first-class cricketer who played all his games for  Cambridge University Cricket Club.  His highest score of 18 came when playing for Cambridge University in the match against Glamorgan County Cricket Club.   His best bowling of 2/60  came in the same match.

He also played in a match for the Public Schools against the Australians in a pre season tour of England by Australia.

References

English cricketers
Cambridge University cricketers
1906 births
1970 deaths